Parasite Cone is a small parasitic cone on the northwest flank of Mount Overlord, 6.5 nautical miles (12 km) distant from the latter's summit, in the Mountaineer Range, Victoria Land. Given this descriptive name by the northern party of New Zealand Geological Survey Antarctic Expedition (NZGSAE), 1962–63.

Volcanoes of Victoria Land
Borchgrevink Coast
Parasitic cones